Michael John David Westbrook   (born 21 March 1936) is an English jazz pianist, composer, and writer of orchestrated jazz pieces. He is married to the vocalist, librettist and painter Kate Westbrook.

Early work
Mike Westbrook was born in High Wycombe, Buckinghamshire, England, and grew up in Torquay. After a spell in accountancy and his National Service (some of it in Germany) he went to art school, studying painting, in Plymouth. There he also began his first bands in 1958, soon joined by such musicians as John Surman, Lou Gare and Keith Rowe.

After moving to London in 1962, Westbrook led numerous bands, large and small, and played regularly at the Old Place and the Little Theatre Club at Garrick Yard, St Martin's Lane. Together with Chris McGregor's Brotherhood of Breath, Westbrook shared the role of house-band at Ronnie Scott's Jazz Club.

He became a key figure in the development of British jazz, producing several big-band records for the Deram label, with the newly formed Mike Westbrook Concert Band, between 1967 and 1969. These featured such musicians as Surman, Mike Osborne and Harry Miller. The band varied in size from 10 to 26 musicians.

In 1968 his band made their international debut at the Montreux Festival with Malcolm Griffiths, Alan Jackson, Harry Miller, Mike Osborne and John Surman.

His music was given exposure on BBC Radio, on the Jazz Club and Jazz Scene programmes on BBC Radio One, and he started to act as a presenter and commentator on new British Jazz through 1968 and 1969. He was featured on BBC TV, when Jazz Scene transferred to the BBC 2 TV service.  The station broadcast The Mike Westbrook Concert Band performing 'Metropolis', based on Westbrook's impressions of first visiting London, on Tuesday 25 November 1969 at 20.45 from the Ronnie Scott Club. The British Arts Council awarded Westbrook a bursary to develop 'Metropolis' for an enlarged Concert Band, and the jazz suite was further broadcast on BBC Radio Three on Friday 9 January 1970 at 21.00. Westbrook's compositions and performances were regularly broadcast by the BBC throughout the 1970s and 1980s. 'Metropolis' was recorded at Landsdowne Studios, London, on 3, 4 and 5 August 1971 and released by on RCA Victor in the UK and Japan. A further major extended orchestral composition, 'Citadel/Room 315', featuring saxophonist John Surman, was recorded in March 1975.

The 1970s saw a wide range of different projects.  Cosmic Circus, jointly founded with John Fox, who was also a composer, specialised in large scale, one-off high technology shows involving high-divers, tight-rope, carnival processions and more. It was part of Earthrise Tour in the UK (May 1970 to October 1971). This included also singer/vocalist Norma Winstone who performed on several of the band's albums at the time.

Adrian Mitchell drew Mike Westbrook in for his musical Tyger on the life of William Blake for the Royal National Theatre. This would become a major influence on Mike Westbrook's work (see paragraph on later work below).

In 1972 and 1973, he also worked in the context of his jazz-rock band Solid Gold Cadillac. The most consequential effect of this was the participation of Phil Minton. His unmistakable voice would feature in many of Westbrook's later projects. A live performance of Solid Gold Cadillac (at the Paris Theatre in London) has been repeatedly broadcast by BBC Radio 6 between 2002 and 2007.

In March 1977, the Mike Westbrook Brass Band, avant-rock group Henry Cow and folk singer Frankie Armstrong merged to form the Orckestra. The ensemble performed in London and several cities in Europe, their last concert being in Bordeaux, France, in May 1978.

Later work
His work for the theatre began with Adrian Mitchell's Tyger, a celebration of William Blake, staged by the Royal National Theatre in 1971. This became a vehicle for his Brass Band of the 1970s and 1980s and the LP The Westbrook Blake – Bright As Fire followed on in 1980. A revised and expanded version of the work was re-recorded in 1997 and named Glad Day. Westbrook recorded the poem "The Human Abstract" in 1982.

The Brass Band also recorded Mama Chicago, described as a "Jazz Cabaret", which featured the voices of Phil Minton and Kate Westbrook. The album was released on CD for the first time in 2007. More recently Mike Westbrook has developed the work further and it now includes an adult choir and on occasion, a children's choir at live performances.

Westbrook was awarded an OBE in 1988, and in 2004 the University of Plymouth awarded him an Honorary Doctorate of Music.

Other projects include ART WOLF inspired by the life and work of the Alpine painter Caspar Wolf. In this Kate and Mike Westbrook are joined by saxophonists Pete Whyman and Chris Biscoe. In another project the couple have been joined by four leading Devon musicians to form the Village Band. The acoustic brass band perform many jazz standards and an original piece, the Waxeywork Show, with music written by Mike and text by Kate. The band perform mainly in the Devon and Cornwall area and in 2006 they performed several times at the London Jazz Festival.

More recent projects include Fine 'n Yellow, a piece written in celebration of the lives of Margery and John Styles, two friends who were founders of the Westbrook newsletter, The Smith's Academy Informer. The piece was recorded and CD copies were given to subscribers of the newsletter. It has since had a general CD release. Kate and Mike were once again joined by saxophonists Pete Whyman and Chris Biscoe. Steve Berry played bass and Jon Hiseman featured on drums. The piece received its first public performance in a concert that marked Mike Westbrook's 75th birthday at Kings Place in London on 2 April 2011. The musicians at the performance with Kate and Mike Westbrook were Chris Biscoe, Chris Caldwell and Andy Tweed, saxophones; Karen Street, saxophone and accordion; Steve Berry, bass; and Simon Pearson, drums. Another work was premiered at this concert, The Serpent Hit, which used the above musicians but without Steve Berry. The Serpent Hit, like Fine 'n Yellow, has texts by Kate Westbrook and music by Mike Westbrook. Yet another project finds Mike working with some of the finest west country musicians in The Mike Westbrook Big Band. They play a number of Westbrook originals and Mike's arrangements of pieces by Duke Ellington and others.

In 2012, the trio released Three into Wonderfull, an album digitally re-mastered by Jon Hiseman, presenting a cross-section of the group's recordings over three decades as well as previously unreleased material from the mid-1990s.

The Mike Westbrook Big Band, also now known as The Uncommon Orchestra, released an album called A Bigger Show in 2016. Recorded in concert at the Barnfield Theatre (Exeter) by Jon Hiseman and Miles Ashton, it is a reworking of the Waxeywork Show originally performed by The Village Band. The 21-member line-up include long-term Westbrook collaborators such as Dave Holdsworth and Alan Wakeman, as well as younger, rising musicians.

Mike Westbrook was 80 years old in 2016 and as part of the celebrations recorded his first solo piano album for 40 years, entitled PARIS. It was recorded live over two nights at Hélène Aziza's art gallery in Paris by drummer Jon Hiseman.

Discography

Albums
 Celebration (1967) (Deram)
 Release (1969) UK LP has a 1969 publishing date on the label and 1968 on the sleeve, most internet sources suggest 1968 as the year of release. (Deram)
 Marching Song – Volumes 1 And 2 (1969) (Deram)
 Love Songs (1970) (Deram)
 Metropolis (1971) (RCA Neon)
 Tyger (1971) (RCA)
 Live (1972) (Cadillac)
 Solid Gold Cadillac (1971) (RCA)
 Brain Damage (1973) (RCA)
 Citadel/Room 315 (1974) (RCA)
 For The Record (1975) (Transatlantic)
 Love/Dream and Variations (1976) (Transatlantic Records)
 Piano (1976)
 Goose Sauce (1978)
 Mama Chicago (2 cds) (1979)
 The Westbrook Blake – Bright As Fire (1980)
 The Paris Album (1981)
 The Cortège (Original, 1983)
 A Little Westbrook Music (1983)
 Love For Sale (1985)
 On Duke's Birthday (Hathut, 1985)
 The Ass  (1985)
 London Bridge Is Broken Down (2 CDs) (1986)
 Pier Rides (1986)
 Westbrook-Rossini (hat ART, 1987)
 Westbrook-Rossini, Zürich Live 1986 (hat ART, 1994)
 Off Abbey Road (1989)
 Stage Set  (1995)
 Bar Utopia (1996)
 Love or Infatuation  (1997)
 The Orchestra of Smith's Academy (1998)
 Platterback (1998)
 Glad Day (Settings of William Blake) (1999)
 L'ascenseur: Lift (2002)
  (2003)
 Art Wolf  (2005)
 Waxeywork Show (2008)
 Fine 'n' Yellow  (2009)
 allsorts  (2009)
 Mama Chicago – DVD (2011) (Gonzo: Gonzo HST052DVD)
 Three Into Wonderfull (2012) (Voiceprint: VP 557, compilation)
 The Serpent Hit  (2013) (Westbrook Records: WR 001)
 Glad Day – Live – DVD/CD (2014) (Westbrook Records: WR002DVD-5 / WR002CD-2)
 A Bigger Show – CD (2016) (ASC Records: ascd 162/163)
 PARIS – CD (2016) (ASC Records: ascd 166)
Starcross Bridge – CD (2017) – (hatology 754)
Last Night At The Old Place – CD (2018) – (Cadillac SGCCD016)
Catania – CD (2019) – (Westbrook Records WR004)
Love and Understanding: Citadel/Room 315 Sweden '74 – 2LP + CD – (2020) (My Only Desire Records MOD003)
London Bridge Live in Zurich 1990 – CD (2022) – (Westbrook Records WR011)

Singles
 "A Life of Its Own" (1969)
 "The Human Abstract" (1982) (Original Records: ABO 8)

Bibliography
Ian Carr, Music Outside: Contemporary Jazz in Britain, 2nd edn. London: Northway Publications, 2008,

See also
 Cadillac (record label)
 List of experimental big bands

References

External links

 WestbrookJazz – Mike Westbrook's official site
 WestbrookJazz.de – Mike Westbrook's main discography site
 

1936 births
Progressive big band bandleaders
English jazz composers
Male jazz composers
English male composers
Living people
English jazz pianists
Avant-garde jazz pianists
British male pianists
21st-century pianists
21st-century British male musicians
Solid Gold Cadillac members
The Orckestra members
Officers of the Order of the British Empire